Wyn Wiley (born ), known professionally as Pattie Gonia, is a drag queen, environmental and LGBTQ+ activist, and community organizer.

Early life and education
Wiley is from Lincoln, Nebraska. He is an Eagle Scout.

Gonia graduated from the University of Nebraska–Lincoln with a degree in advertising and public relations in 2014. Wiley has worked as a creative director and professional photographer.

Activism and career

Wiley's first experiment with drag was in early 2018, as the character "Ginger Snap". In October 2018, Wiley created the character Pattie Gonia, producing short-form outdoors activism content on Instagram and TikTok, while in drag. The first video as Pattie Gonia, posted on October 3, gained more than 100 million views. The name Pattie Gonia is a pun on Patagonia, an American outdoor clothing company. Pattie Gonia's activism focuses on environmental and LGBTQ+ issues, promoting acceptance of queer identities in the environmentalist and outdoors communities, and promoting awareness of climate change and its effects. Euronews described this form of activism as "intersectional environmentalism".

In addition to online content, Pattie Gonia organizes in-person hikes and events for LGBT+ and environmental causes. They also developed a job board for queer outdoorists. In January 2022, Wiley co-founded "The Outdoorist Oath", a nonprofit working on diversity, equity, and inclusion and environmental causes in the outdoors community. Pattie Gonia partnered with The North Face for their 2022 "Summer of Pride" series. The series comprised four outdoor community-building events focused on local LGBTQ+ engagement and acceptance.

In 2020, Pattie Gonia was named to the Out100, Out magazine's annual list of the "most impactful and influential LGBTQ+ people." They were also nominated for the Shorty Awards in the LGBTQ+ category.

Media coverage
In December 2018, Wiley was interviewed by REI alongside the release of his first music video as Pattie Gonia. In November 2019, Pattie Gonia was the subject of a REI documentary titled "Dear Mother Nature". It was accompanied by a shorter, 3-minute spoken word poem video titled "Everything to Lose". Pattie Gonia later produced a video with BBC News about the activist's work in March 2020.

Pattie Gonia attracted media attention for attending the January 2019 Outdoor Retailer trade show in all-white drag.

In October 2022, Pattie Gonia was the subject of media coverage for their Halloween costume, where they dressed as climate change. They have previously designed other outfits in support of climate causes and awareness, such as a dress and wigs made of recycled trash, for their TikTok and Instagram content.

Personal life 
Pattie Gonia uses she/they pronouns when in drag and while out of drag Wyn Wiley uses he/they pronouns. Wiley identifies as a gay male.

See also
Leah Thomas
REI

References

LGBT rights activists
American environmentalists
Living people
People from Lincoln, Nebraska
University of Nebraska–Lincoln alumni
Year of birth missing (living people)